The 1980 United States presidential election in California took place on November 4, 1980 as part of the 1980 United States presidential election. State voters chose 45 representatives, or electors, to the Electoral College, who voted for president and vice president.

California voted for the Republican nominee, the state's former governor Ronald Reagan, in a landslide over the Democratic incumbent, Jimmy Carter.  Reagan won his home state by a wide 16.78% point margin and carried all but three counties. Among the counties Reagan won was Plumas, the first Republican victory in that county since 1920. Reagan is also the last Republican candidate to carry the counties of Marin and Santa Cruz in a presidential election.  Carter carried only three of the state's 58 counties: Alameda, San Francisco and Yolo.

1980 marks the most recent election in which California voted more Republican than the United States as a whole. This election indeed constitutes the most Republican California has voted relative to the whole nation since 1928, when anti-Catholic prejudice against Al Smith had a substantial influence; here, it was widely believed that Carter lacked understanding of critical Western issues, most importantly water development. This also remains the last time a Republican won the San Francisco Bay Area, and the last one in which San Francisco gave less than 60% of the vote to the Democratic candidate. As of 2020, this is the last presidential election in which California voted more Republican than Texas.

Primaries

Results

Results by county

References

California
1980
1980 California elections